Bhakta Nandanar is a 1935 Tamil-language film directed by Manik Lal Tandon. It marked the cinematic debut of the Carnatic singer and stage artist K. B. Sundarambal. She was paid a then unprecedented 100,000 (equivalent of 60 million (2013 prices)) as salary for this film. This was also the first film for Ellis R. Dungan. No print of the film is known to survive, making it a lost film.

Plot 
The story is based on the life of Nandanar (also known as Thirunaalai Povar – thee who pilgrims tomorrow) and his becoming of a Naayanar.

Cast 
K. B. Sundarambal as Nandanar
Maharajapuram Viswanatha Iyer as Vedhiyar

Production 

K. B. Sundarambal had retired from stage performances in 1932 after the death of her husband S. G. Kittappa. Hassandas, a textile magnate from Madras and a member of Chellaram  business family was keen on making a film with Sundarambal in the lead. She was initially reluctant to star in the film and refused even the recommendation of her mentor S. Satyamurti. Hassandas persisted and to discourage him she offered to act in the film if he could pay One lakh Rupees. Hassandas agreed to pay her and the film was made.

The film was directed by Manik Lal Tandon with Ellis Dungan shooting many scenes in his absence. Sundarambal was cast as a man – the untouchable saint Nandanar. The same story had earlier been the subject of a 1932 Tamil film of the same name. Carnatic musician Maharajapuram Viswanatha Iyer was cast as the landlord Vedhiyar. He was paid 3000 Rs as salary. The script had a scene where Iyer's character would prostrate before Nandanar. Due to the prevailing social norms and her respect for Iyer, Sundarambal refused to do the scene. Director Tandon filmed a compromise by changing the scene such that both prostrated before each other. The completed film cost  to make and was 18000 feet long. Tunes of three songs from the 1934 Hindi film Chandidas  were reused in this film.

Reception 
The film was released in 1935 amid great expectations from the public. It failed at the box office and received mixed reviews from the critics. Kalki Krishnamurthy made fun of it in Ananda Vikatan by claiming buffaloes and palm trees had acted well in the film. He wrote the number one actor in the film was the coconut tree, number two was the buffalo and number three, the kid goat. The Tamil newspaper Dina Mani also gave it an unfavourable review. Writing in the April 1938 issue of the Eelakesari, Pudhumaipithan explained the reasons for its failure:

However it received favourable reviews in 15 July 1935 issues of The Hindu, Tamil Nadu, Sudesamithran and Cinema Ulagam. Viswanatha Iyer was criticised by conservative brahimins of his hometown Kumbakonam for acting in the film.

References 

1935 films
Indian biographical films
1930s Tamil-language films
Films about social class
Lost Indian films
1930s biographical films
Indian black-and-white films
1935 lost films